NextDC is an Australian data centre operator. , the company operates 11 data centres around Australia, with facilities in Melbourne, Sydney, Brisbane, Perth and Canberra.

History 

NextDC was founded by Bevan Slattery in 2010.

In 2015, NextDC was named by Deloitte as Australia's fastest growing technology company. It has been listed on the Australian Securities Exchange since 2016.

In July 2020, NextDC opened P2, its second data centre in Perth.

In November 2021, NextDC invested around $17 million for a 19.99% stake in AUCloud.

In February 2022, NextDC announced that it will invest more than $100 million to build a data centre on Pirie Street, Adelaide.

Data centres

Organisational structure 
Board members

 Douglas Flynn (Chairman)
 Craig Scroggie (CEO and Managing Director)
 Gregory J Clark AC
 Jennifer Lambert
Eileen Doyle
Stuart Davis
 Stephen Smith
 Michael Helmer

References

Data centers
Companies listed on the Australian Securities Exchange
Information technology companies of Australia
Technology companies established in 2010
2010 establishments in Australia